The men's freestyle 96 kilograms wrestling competition at the 2002 Asian Games in Busan was held on 7 October and 8 October at the Yangsan Gymnasium.

The competition held with an elimination system of three or four wrestlers in each pool, with the winners qualify for the semifinals and final by way of direct elimination.

Schedule
All times are Korea Standard Time (UTC+09:00)

Results 
Legend
F — Won by fall
WO — Won by walkover

Preliminary

Pool 1

Pool 2

Pool 3

Repechage

Knockout round

Final standing

References
2002 Asian Games Official Report, Page 771
FILA Database

Wrestling at the 2002 Asian Games